Salomon Herman "Sal" Hamburger (11 July 1898 – 14 November 1946), known under his  pseudonym Herman de Man,  was a Dutch novelist.

Life and work
Salomon Herman Hamburger was born on 11 July 1898 in Woerden in the Netherlands.

De Man, son of businessman Herman Salomon Hamburger and Sarah Cohen Schavrien, grew up in the Lopikerwaard area. His family has lived in Woerden, Benschop, Oudewater and Gouda. Many of his later novels are set in the places where he grew up. His novel The rising waters, which appeared in 1991, the 30th print, is located in the Lopikerwaard. The book received wide publicity, partly because it was made into a 1986 eight-part television series: six million viewers viewed this series that year. It was then repeated several times, most recently in 2011. De Man died in an airplane crash on 14 November 1946 during a third unsuccessful landing attempt of a Douglas C-47 of KLM. The aircraft was following a course correction and crashed to the ground. All 21 passengers and 5 crew were killed.

Works
 De barre winter van negentig  
 Rijshout en rozen 
 Het wassende water 
 Van winter tot winter 
 Aardebanden
 Zonen van de Paardekop 
 Geiten 
 Heilig Pietje de Booy 
 Kapitein Aart Luteyn & Aart Luteyn de andere 
 De koets 
 Stoombootje in de mist & Scheepswerf de Kroonprinces

References
 Biography at the Biografisch Woordenboek van Nederland

External links

 Hamburger Biography, Salomon Herman (1898-1946)
 Joods Historisch Museum - Biography, Herman de Man
 Stichting Dodenakkers.nl - Biography, Herman de Man

1898 births
1946 deaths
Dutch male novelists
People from Woerden
People from Lopik 
20th-century Dutch novelists
20th-century Dutch male writers
20th-century pseudonymous writers